Diabaig  is a remote coastal fishing and crofting township in Wester Ross, in the Northwest Highlands of Scotland. Diabaig lies on the north shore of the sea loch of Loch Diabaig, an inlet off the north side of Loch Torridon, and is in the Highland council area.

The main part of the settlement is known as Lower Diabaig.

Geography
Diabaig is at the end of a minor road, the C1083, which runs along the north side of Loch Torridon, from the village of Torridon. The villages of Alligin Shuas and Inveralligin lie to the southeast along this road. A footpath continues along the coast from Diabaig, running  to the small settlement of Redpoint, near Gairloch.

Filming
Loch Diabaig played the part of Loch Ness in the 1996 film of the same name, in which Ted Danson starred.

References

Populated places in Ross and Cromarty
Torridon